Crack was a Spanish progressive rock group in the late 1970s. Si Todo Hiciera Crack was their only album released in 1979 by the record label Chapa.

Members 
 Alberto Fontaneda: Vocals, guitar and flute. 
 Mento Hevia: Keyboards and vocals. 
 Alex Cabral: Bass. 
 Manolo Jimenez: Battery. 
 Rafael Rodriguez: Guitar.

External links 
 Allmusic
 Grandes Grupos del Rock Progresivo Español: Crack (1978 - 1979) (in Spanish)
 Crack at Rateyourmusic
 La Enciclopedia del Rock Sinfónico y Progresivo Español (in Spanish)
 Historias del rock (in Spanish)
 progresiva70s.com
 Manticornio

Spanish progressive rock groups
Musical groups established in 1977